An incomplete list of films produced in Brazil in the 1980s. For an A-Z list of films currently on Wikipedia see :Category:Brazilian films.

1980
List of Brazilian films of 1980

1981
List of Brazilian films of 1981

1982
List of Brazilian films of 1982

1983
List of Brazilian films of 1983

1984
List of Brazilian films of 1984

1985
List of Brazilian films of 1985

1986-1989

References

External links
 Brazilian film at the Internet Movie Database

Lists of 1980s films
Films